Hermitage, Tennessee, is a neighborhood, located in eastern Davidson County, adjacent to – and named in honor of – The Hermitage, the historic home of Andrew Jackson, seventh President of the United States. Although the area is incorporated as part of the Metropolitan Government of Nashville and Davidson County, it maintains its own identity as a residential and commercial suburban area.

Hermitage is located immediately to the east of Donelson, a Nashville borough named in honor of Andrew Jackson's father-in-law John Donelson, and just to the west of Mount Juliet in adjacent Wilson County. Once a rural area, Hermitage is now a thriving district with a highly developed network of retail stores and typical suburban tract houses, ranging from the "starter home" to the "executive residence". The technology headquarters of Deloitte Touche Tohmatsu, one of the Big Four auditors, is located in Hermitage, sprawling across  and employing more than 1,000 people. 

Major thoroughfares include U.S. Route 70, Interstate 40, and State Route 45. The neighborhood also has a station on the Music City Star commuter rail service and is home to the Tennessee Secondary School Athletic Association, the organization that administers junior and senior high school sporting events.

Hermitage is divided from Donelson by the Stones River and its bottom lands, Clover Bottom. It has benefited from the impoundment of the Stones by J. Percy Priest Dam, a nearby United States Army Corps of Engineers project that provides a number of recreation opportunities, particularly in the summer months. The dam has also contributed to the desirability and value of the area's real estate. Hermitage and Donelson are often thought of as something of a unit and even have a joint Chamber of Commerce and Christmas parade.

Hermitage is generally considered to be roughly included in United States Postal Service ZIP code 37076. The 2016 population estimate is 37,814.

See also
 Hermitage (Music City Star station)

References

External links
Hermitage Community Website HermitageTN.org
Hermitage Community Search Home Page mjrover.com
Donelson-Hermitage Neighborhood Association Website

Neighborhoods in Nashville, Tennessee